Günter Lörke (born 23 June 1935) is a former German cyclist. He won the silver medal in team time trial at the 1960 Summer Olympics.

Bevor, he was national Champion with his Team SC DHfK Leipzig in Teamtrial in 1957 and 1958.

References

1935 births
German male cyclists
German track cyclists
Olympic cyclists of the United Team of Germany
Cyclists at the 1960 Summer Olympics
Olympic silver medalists for the United Team of Germany
Olympic medalists in cycling
Living people
People from Choszczno County
People from the Province of Brandenburg
Medalists at the 1960 Summer Olympics
Cyclists from Saxony
People from Bezirk Leipzig